Pieris krueperi, the Krueper's small white, is a butterfly in the family Pieridae. It is found on the Balkan Peninsula and in Iran, Baluchistan, the Kopet-Dagh and from Asia Minor to Central Asia, as well as in Oman.

Adults are on wing from April to September in two or three generations per year.

The larvae feed on Alyssum (including Alyssum montanum) and Aurinia species.

Subspecies
Pieris krueperi krueperi
Pieris krueperi devta (de Nicéville, [1884]) (Tian-Shan, Ghissar, southern Ghissar, Darvaz, Alai, western Pamirs)

References

Butterflies described in 1860
krueperi
Butterflies of Europe
Butterflies of Asia
Taxa named by Otto Staudinger